Shunde, China Furniture Wholesale Market is located at Shunde district which connects Lecong town and Longjiang town along the 10 km highway, Foshan City, Guangdong Province, China. 

Shunde has become the largest furniture wholesale market and distribution center in China and the world. It claims to be the world's largest furniture wholesale market. It was named as the China Furniture Business and Trading Capital by the China National Light Industry Council and China National Furniture Association. It covers a total area of approximately 32.3 million square feet (3 million square meters and it includes more than 200 modern furniture sales buildings, such as Sunlink Group, Lecong International Furniture Exhibition Center, Shunde Empire Group, Tuanyi International Furniture City, and others.

Location
The furniture wholesale market extends more than 5 km and is arranged by 12 rows and 20 streets. There are over 3,300 domestic and foreign furniture dealers and more than 1,500 furniture manufacturers. Jointly they display over 20,000 types of furniture and products ranging from living room furniture, dining room furniture, bedroom furniture, kitchen furniture, hotel furniture, hotel mattress, contract furniture, restaurant furniture, cafe chairs, bar stools, bathroom furniture, sanitary ware, furniture accessories, material & hardware. The market is open year-round with furniture trading more than USD1 billion in sales volume each year.

Whereas Longjiang is about 5 km from Lecong, a well-known furniture manufacturing base and transaction center of furniture materials. It was awarded by the China Light Industry Association and China Furniture Association as Important Town Of China Furniture Manufacture and Capital Of China Furniture Material. There are two major furniture exhibitions held in March and August each year at Longjiang town of Shunde district. The Dragon Furniture Fair has a famous reputation of professional fair at home and abroad.

External links 
 Lecong, Shunde Furniture Industries
 Furniture Market in Lecong, Shunde
 Pictures of Lecong furniture wholesales center
 Traffic from GuangZhou city to Lecong Furniture Market
 Lecong Shunde Foshan China Furniture Markets

Shunde District
Retail markets in China
Wholesalers of China
Wholesale markets in China